Catocala coccinata, the scarlet underwing, is a moth of the family Erebidae. The species was first described by Augustus Radcliffe Grote in 1872. It is found in southern Canada and the eastern United States, following river valleys onto the Great Plains and down to Florida.

The wingspan is 57–70 mm. Adults are on wing from June to September depending on the location.

The larvae feed on Quercus species, including Quercus macrocarpa.

Subspecies
Catocala coccinata coccinata
Catocala coccinata sinuosa Grote, 1879 (Florida)

References

External links

Scott, Lynn D. (July 27, 2005). "Catocala coccinata". Lynn Scott's Lepidoptera Index. Archived March 7, 2012.

coccinata
Moths of North America
Moths described in 1872